Turkey is one of the twenty-four participating countries and regions competing in the Turkvision Song Contest.

History

2013
Turkey made their debut in the Turkvision Song Contest at the 2013 festival, in Eskişehir, Turkey.  Manevra were internally selected by TRT TV representatives to represent Turkey, their song was revealed on 16 December 2014 as "Sen, Ben, Biz". In the semi final in Eskişehir, Turkey performed 23rd and qualified for the final, in the final they performed 1st and came in 6th place with 187 points tied with Bosnia and Herzegovina.

2014

On 20 July 2014 it was announced that Turkey would make their second appearance at the Turkvision Song Contest 2014 to be held in Kazan, Tatarstan in November 2014. On 3 September 2014, TMB TV made a call for submissions for singers to take part in the contest in Kazan. On 22 October 2014 it was announced that Funda Kılıç would represent Turkey, on 12 November 2014 it was announced that Funda would sing "Hoppa".

In Kazan, Funda performed 15th in the semi final, before Bosnia and Herzegovina and after Yakutia, Turkey came 2nd with a total of 199 points. In the final Turkey performed 1st, they finished last in 15th place with 128 points.

Participation overview

Hostings

Related involvement

Jury members

See also 
 Turkey in the ABU TV Song Festival
 Turkey in the Eurovision Song Contest

Notes and references

Notes

References

Turkvision
Countries in the Turkvision Song Contest